Give US Your Poor is a compilation album of 19 tracks by Bruce Springsteen & Pete Seeger, Jon Bon Jovi, Madeleine Peyroux, Bonnie Raitt, and other stars, many in collaboration with currently or formerly homeless musicians on benefit CD to fight homelessness.

Two years in the making, this fundraising CD created by Appleseed Recordings and the national Give US Your Poor organization at UMass Boston brings together established musicians, socially committed actors and currently or previously homeless musicians in a collection of mostly exclusive new recordings that address the ongoing crisis of homelessness in America. There are frequent collaborations between the stars, who donated their time and music, and their formerly or currently homeless brethren on songs that often reflect on existence without guaranteed lodging, food, and the simple necessities of human existence.

Track listing

References
[ All music entry]

Charity albums
2008 compilation albums